Alexander Ludwig (born 31 January 1984) is a German former professional footballer who played as a midfielder.

Ludwig began his career with Hertha BSC, making four Bundesliga appearances, before joining Dynamo Dresden in August 2005. He moved to FC St. Pauli in 2007 after they beat Dynamo to promotion, and left for TSV 1860 Munich two years later.

References

External links

 

1984 births
Living people
People from Waltershausen
People from Bezirk Erfurt
German footballers
Footballers from Thuringia
Association football midfielders
Germany youth international footballers
Germany under-21 international footballers
Hertha BSC II players
Hertha BSC players
Dynamo Dresden players
FC St. Pauli players
TSV 1860 Munich players
FC Energie Cottbus players
Sportfreunde Lotte players
Goslarer SC 08 players
BSG Stahl Riesa players
FC Rot-Weiß Erfurt players
Bundesliga players
2. Bundesliga players
3. Liga players